Hardwire or hardwired may refer to:

Electrical wiring
Hardwired control unit, a part of a computer's central processing unit
In computer programming, a kludge to temporarily or quickly fix a problem
Wired communication

In arts and entertainment:
Hardwire (comics), a Malibu Comics villain
"Hardwire", a song by Metric, from the 2007 album Grow Up and Blow Away
Hard Wired, a 1995 album by the band Front Line Assembly
Hardwired, a book series by Walter Jon Williams, including the 1986 science fiction novel Hardwired
Hardwired, a web series by AOL
Hardwired, a pre-release version of the 1994 video game Red Zone
Hardwired (film), a 2009 action film
Hardwired... to Self-Destruct, an album by Metallica, often referred to simply as Hardwired
Hardwired (song), a song by Metallica on the aforementioned album

See also
Hard coding, embedding software input or configuration data into source code